The Sound of Music Festival is an annual music festival in Burlington, Ontario, Canada.  It is held in mid-June and usually falls on the Father's Day weekend.

The festival has free admission and spreads along the city's waterfront Spencer Smith Park and into the downtown core. It bills itself as "Canada's Largest Free Music Festival", and utilizes several stages throughout the waterfront and downtown area.

Musical performers have included:

External links
The Sound of Music Festival

References

Burlington, Ontario
Music festivals in Ontario
Tourist attractions in the Regional Municipality of Halton